Montaigu or Montaigut may refer to:

Places

Belgium
the French exonym for Scherpenheuvel

France

Montaigu, Aisne, in the Aisne département 
Montaigu, Jura, in the Jura département
Montaigu, Vendée, in the Vendée département
Montaigu-de-Quercy, in the Tarn-et-Garonne département 
Montaigu-la-Brisette, in the Manche département
Montaigu-le-Blin, in the Allier département 
Montaigu-les-Bois, in the Manche département
Montaigu-Vendée, in the Vendée département
Montaigut, Puy-de-Dôme, in the Puy-de-Dôme département 
Montaigut-le-Blanc, Creuse, in the Creuse département 
Montaigut-le-Blanc, Puy-de-Dôme, in the Puy-de-Dôme département 
Montaigut-sur-Save, in the Haute-Garonne département
Château de Montaigut at Gissac in the Aveyron département

Other uses
 Collège de Montaigu, a constituent college of the Faculty of Arts of the University of Paris
 Counts of Montaigu, a French noble family of the 11th and 12th centuries
 Sofia Achaval de Montaigu, Argentine designer, stylist, editor, and model
 Thibault de Montaigu, French writer and journalist

See also
Montagu (disambiguation)
Montague (disambiguation)